Dominic Thiem became the inaugural champion when Teymuraz Gabashvili retired 7–6(7–4), 5–1.

Seeds

Draw

Finals

Top half

Bottom half

References
 Main Draw
 Qualifying Draw

Morocco Tennis Tour - Kenitra - Singles
2013 Singles
Tennis Tour - Kenitra - Singles